Just Annoying is a short story collection by children's author and comedian Andy Griffiths. It is the second in the Just series. The stories, as expected from the title, recounts more short stories where Andy annoys everyone with his amazing feats.

Stories

Are We There Yet
After Andy annoys his father by repeatedly asking, "Are we there yet?" and trying to get rid of a fly in the car, he is kicked out of the car in the middle of nowhere (presumably in western New South Wales). A young boy  on his motorcycle sees Andy and picks him up to chase Andy's car and to come back to them. After the man catches up to the car, Andy jumps from the motorcycle to the car. Andy's car stops to a halt when his parents see Andy on the windshield. Andy's father goes berserk, telling Andy he was going to be picked up in only five minutes.

Copycat From Ballarat
Andrea (actually Andy crossdressing as a girl) goes to the school dance, attempting to impress Craig Bennett (who is every girl's crush, including a girl named Jen, Andy's sister). After the dance, Andrea embarrasses herself in front of her crush, Craig, by falling on her butt.

Wish you Weren't Here
Andy visits his grandparents in Mildura with a gnome from his neighbour's garden. When strange things start happening around him, he begins to suspect that the gnome is alive.

Imaginary Friends
Andy gets out of going to the school sports by looking after his imaginary friend, Fred. He gets out of going because he thinks he is better at everything than everyone else, and wants to give them a fair go. But when his mother gets attached to Fred, he invites a mean imaginary friend called Damien, who she unfortunately gets attached to as well.

In the Shower with Andy
Andy wants to see what it feels like to have the shower full of water during the time Mr. and Mrs. Bainbridge are at Andy's house for dinner with his parents. With a lot of time on his hands, Andy seals up the door with a silicone gun from his father. Unfortunately, he accidentally breaks the hot tap, and ends up nearly drowning in cold water. The only way out is through the fan. He reaches up and pulls it, and is on the insulation patches as the water rises up the stall. With his rubber duck with him, a fiber in the vent pokes him, causing him to drop the duck due to being startled by the pain. He goes after the duck, but realizes quickly that the ceiling there is unsupported. The ceiling caves in and he finds himself lying legs spread on the dinner table, nude.

Would You Rather?
At the dinner table with his family, Andy asks a silly question to his whole family at the dinner table - "would you rather be eaten by ants or lions?". Andy and his father have a whole discussion about this while occasionally being interrupted. The story ends with no real answer from the three.

Murder, Bloody Murder!
Andy and Danny scream, "MURDER, BLOODY MURDER!" at Andy's neighbour Mr. Broadbent for ages. Mr. Broadbent gets very angry, so he gets them to shut up. They suspect that his bad mood is due to stress, so they attempt to "de-stress" him but this annoys him further, and they end up yelling the phrase again.

The Last Jaffa
While watching a James Bond movie (presumably a repeat of The Spy Who Loved Me) at the cinema stuck behind a lady with tall hair, Andy loses his last Jaffa and annoys a lot of people while finding it. He is accused of being a thief and a pervert while looking for his Jaffa, and has security called on him. He uses a variety of spy-inspired strategies to eventually avoid the people in the movie trying to catch him. Eventually, to escape the crush of people after him, Andy jumps through the screen and finds many Jaffas, along with other candy, found left over on the floor from people's past times at the theater.

Swinging on the Clothesline
Andy spends a lot of time trying to breaking the clothesline speed record, which annoys his parents a lot. To make sure Andy stops, Dad trades a huge dog with Sooty (the family pet) and leaves it to guard the clothesline. Andy uses bait to get the dog to swing him around. Going too fast to hold on, Andy lets go, flying into the kitchen window. The last spoken line is said by Andy: "If the window doesn't kill me, my parents will."

External links
Andy Griffiths - Just Annoying

Short story collections by Andy Griffiths
Children's short story collections
1998 short story collections
Pan Books books
1998 children's books